Pato Branco ("White Duck" in English) is a municipality in the state of Paraná in Brazil. The municipality covers 537,8 km² (206.7 mi²) and has a population of 83,843 (2020 IBGE estimate). Pato Branco started off as a village in 1942 and was given status as a city December 14, 1952. It has two private colleges, Faculdade Mater Dei and Faculdade de Pato Branco, and a campus of the Federal University of Technology - Paraná. The city has experienced a positive economic development throughout the last few years.

Pato Branco is located 760 meters above sea level and has a sub-tropical climate with warm summers and mild winters, morning frost being usual during the winter season. Occasional snowfall. There is no defined period of drought. The coldest month of the year is July with an average temperature of 14.2°C (57.6°F). January is the warmest month with an average of 22.5°C (72.5°F).

The current mayor (elected for 2021-2024) is Robson Cantu.

The city has a small commercial airport with flights to Curitiba (Juvenal Loureiro Cardoso Airport).

Former Brazil International footballer, Alexandre Pato is from the city. He notably played in Europe for the likes of Chelsea FC & AC Milan. Rogério Ceni, a notable goalkeeper that won the 2002 FIFA World Cup and as of 2022, he own the record of most goals scored by a goalkeeper, with 131 goals also was born in the city.

Notable people
Daniel Grando (born 1985), footballer
Alexandre Pato
Rogério Ceni

References

External links
Official site